Anna Klara Ellen Oskarsson (also spelled Oscarsson; born 23 June 1996) is a Swedish footballer who plays as a defender for Eskilstuna United DFF. She started with Jitex Mölndal BK as a youth player. Oskarsson has also represented FC Gute.

Oskarsson represented Sweden in the U19 European Championships in Israel 2015 and the U20 World Championship in Papua New Guinea in 2016.

She made her debut for the senior national team at the 2018 Algarve Cup, substituting in for Jonna Andersson in the 77th minute of Sweden's opening fixture, a 3–1 win over Canada. A thigh injury sustained in December 2018 caused Oskarsson to drop out of national team contention in the run up to the 2019 FIFA Women's World Cup.

Before the 2020 season, Oscarsson was recruited by Eskilstuna United, where she signed a two-year contract. Oscarsson played all 22 league matches during the 2020 season. In November 2021, she extended her contract in Eskilstuna by two year.

References

External links

 
 Anna Oskarsson at Linköpings FC
 Anna Oskarsson at Swedish Football Association (SvFF) 

1996 births
Swedish sportswomen
Living people
Women's association football defenders
Damallsvenskan players
Linköpings FC players
Jitex BK players
Hammarby Fotboll (women) players
Swedish women's footballers
Sweden women's international footballers
IFK Kalmar players
People from Eskilstuna
Sportspeople from Södermanland County